Rollins House may refer to:

Rollins House, Tallahassee, Florida
Ralph Rollins House, Des Moines, Iowa